"Austin Prison" is a song written by Johnny Cash and originally recorded by him on Columbia Records for his 1966 novelty album Everybody Loves a Nut.

It was first released in May 1966 as the flip side to the second single (Columbia 4-43673, "Everybody Loves a Nut" / "Austin Prison") from the yet-to-be-released album.

Lyrical analysis

Track listing

References

External links 
 "Austin Prison" on the Johnny Cash official website

Johnny Cash songs
1966 singles
Columbia Records singles
1966 songs
Songs written by Johnny Cash